The 2016–17 Providence Friars women's basketball team will represent Providence College in the 2016–17 NCAA Division I women's basketball season. The Friars, led by first year head coach Jim Crowley, played their home games at Alumni Hall and were members of the Big East Conference. They finished the season 12–18, 4–14 in Big East play to finish in a tie for seventh place. They lost in the first round of the Big East women's tournament to Seton Hall.

Roster

Schedule

|-
!colspan=9 style="background:#000000; color:#C0C0C0;"| Exhibition

|-
!colspan=9 style="background:#000000; color:#C0C0C0;"| Non-conference regular season

|-
!colspan=9 style="background:#000000; color:#C0C0C0;"| Big East regular season

|-
!colspan=9 style="background:#000000; color:#C0C0C0;"| Big East Women's Tournament

See also
 2016–17 Providence Friars men's basketball team

References

Providence
Providence Friars women's basketball seasons
Provide
Provide